Engrade was an educational technology company that provides online learning management system and educational assessment products to K-12 school districts. Engrade was founded in 2003 and later acquired by McGraw-Hill Education in January 2014. As of March 2015, Engrade ranks in the top 5,000 US websites. The service was discontinued on June 30th 2019.

History
Engrade was founded by Bri Holt as a high school student in 2003. The company later received 2 rounds of venture capital funding totaling $8 million from Javelin Venture Partners, Rethink Education, Kapor Capital, New Schools Venture Fund, and Samsung Venture Investment Corp. The company grew to a reported 4.5 million users before being acquired by McGraw-Hill Education in January 2014.

Products
Engrade divides its education products into four groups:
Corebook — a gradebook specifically designed for standards-based grading and Common Core alignment.
Teach — a school-wide content management system that integrates third-party content providers.
Assess — a PARCC and SBAC aligned student assessment tool.
Improve — processes data from Engrade tools and third parties to provide district-level reports about student performance.

References

External links
 Engrade - Official website

Software companies based in California
Internet properties established in 2003
Defunct software companies of the United States